Royalties is a soundtrack to the 2020 television series of the same name. The full album was released on June 12, 2020.

Track listing
 “This Is a Theme Song (From Royalties)” – Darren Criss, Kether Donohue, Royalties Cast
 “Just That Good (From Royalties)” – Rufus Wainwright, Royalties Cast
 “Break It In (From Royalties)” – Lil Rel Howery, KingJet, Royalties Cast
 “Let Your Hair Down (From Royalties)” – Bonnie McKee, Royalties Cast
 “Kick Your Shoes Off (From Royalties)” – Bonnie McKee, Royalties Cast
 “Mighty as Kong (From Royalties)” – Mark Hamill, Royalties Cast
 “I Am So Much Better Than You at Everything (From Royalties)” – Darren Criss, Royalties Cast
 “Make You Come True (From Royalties)” – Jordan Fisher, Royalties Cast
 “Prizefighter (From Royalties)” – Julianne Hough, Royalties Cast
 “Also You (From Royalties)” – Jackie Tohn, Darren Criss, Royalties Cast
 “I Hate That I Need You (From Royalties)” – Jennifer Coolidge, NIve, Darren Criss, Royalties Cast
 “Perfect Song (From Royalties)” – Sabrina Carpenter, Royalties Cast

References

2020 soundtrack albums
Television soundtracks